The Michigan National Guard consists of the Michigan Army National Guard and the Michigan Air National Guard. The State adjutant general is Major general Paul D. Rogers.

Units
Michigan Army National Guard units include:
 Recruiting Office: Bay City, MI
 Recruiting Office: Sterling Heights, MI
177th Regional Training Institute - Augusta, MI
126th Press Camp Headquarters - Augusta, MI
Recruiting & Retention Battalion - Lansing, MI
1208th Military Intelligence Platoon - Taylor, MI
51st Civil Support Team - Augusta, MI
Medical Command - Detroit, MI
Detachment 15 Operational Support Airlift - Lansing, MI
Fort Custer Training Center - Augusta, MI
Military Training Center - Grayling, MI
1208th Engineering Survey & Design Team - Lansing, MI
1999th AQ Detachment
1146th Judge Advocate General Detachment - Lansing, MI
Detachment 1, 505th Judge Advocate General - Lansing, MI
63rd Troop Command - Wyoming, MI
1-125th Infantry Battalion - Flint, MI
Company A - Detroit, MI
Company B - Saginaw, MI
Detachment 1 – Alpena, MI
Company C - Wyoming, MI
Company D - Big Rapids, MI
Company F, 237 BSB - Bay City, MI
1-126th Cavalry Squadron - Wyoming, MI
Troop A – Cadillac, MI
Troop B - Manistee, MI
Troop C - Dowagiac, MI
Company D, 237th BSB - Wyoming, MI
Company F, 425th Infantry - Selfridge, MI
1-119th Field Artillery Battalion - Lansing, MI
Battery A - Port Huron, MI
Battery B - Alma, MI
Battery C - Albion, MI
119th Support Company - Augusta, MI
1-182nd Field Artillery Battalion - Detroit, MI
Battery A - Detroit, MI
Battery B - Bay City, MI
Battery C - Lansing, MI
182nd Support Company – Detroit, MI
Detachment 2 – Wyoming, MI
272nd Regional Support Group
1225th Cmd Sustainment Support Battalion - Detroit, MI
1071st Maintenance Company - Grayling, MI
1072nd Maintenance Company - Detroit, MI
1073rd Maintenance Company - Greenville, MI
464th Quartermaster Company – Lapeer, MI
246th Transportation Battalion - Jackson, MI
1460th Transportation Company - Midland, MI
1461st Transportation Company - Jackson, MI
Detachment 1 - Augusta, MI
1462nd Transportation Company - Howell, MI
1463rd Transportation Company - Wyoming, MI
Detachment 1 – Sturgis, MI
146th Multifunctional Medical Battalion - Ypsilanti, MI
1171st Medical Company - Ypsilanti, MI
3-238th General Support Aviation Battalion - Grand Ledge, MI
Detachment 1, Company B – Selfridge, MI
Detachment 1, Company C - Grand Ledge, MI
Company D - Grand Ledge, MI
Company E - Grand Ledge, MI
Company B, 1-112th Aviation - Grand Ledge, MI
Detachment 1, 1-147th Aviation - Grand Ledge, MI
Company B, 1-147th Aviation - Grand Ledge, MI
Company C, 1-147th Aviation - Grand Ledge, MI
Detachment 1, Company D, 1-147th Aviation - Grand Ledge, MI
Detachment 1, Company E, 1-147th Aviation - Grand Ledge, MI
Detachment 2, Company B, 351 Aviation Support - Grand Ledge, MI
46th Military Police Command - Lansing
177th Military Police Brigade – Taylor, MI
210th Military Police Battalion - Taylor
1775th Military Police Company - Pontiac, MI
1776th Military Police Company - Taylor
144th Military Police Company - Reassigned to Nebraska ARNG in 2016
46th Military Police Company - Corunna, MI
777th Military Police Detachment - Taylor
156th Expeditionary Signal Battalion
Company A, 156 ESB, Wyoming, Michigan
Company B, 156 ESB, Kalamazoo, Michigan
Company C, 156 ESB, Howell, Michigan
 HQ, 156 ESB, Taylor, Michigan
631st Troop Command - Lansing, MI
Company B, BSTB, 37th BCT - Lansing, MI
460th Chemical Company - Augusta, MI
126th Army Band – Wyoming, MI
107th Engineer Battalion - Ishpeming, MI
1430th Engineer Company - Gladstone, MI
Detachment 1 - Marquette, MI
1431st Engineer Company - Calumet, MI
Detachment 1 - Kingsford, MI
1432nd Engineer Company - Kingsford, MI
Detachment 1 - Iron River, MI
1437th Engineer Company - Sault Ste. Marie, MI
507th Engineer Battalion - Kalamazoo, MI
1433rd Engineer Company - Augusta, MI
1434th Engineer Company - Grayling, MI
Detachment 1 - Augusta, MI
1436th Engineer Company - Montague, MI
1440th Engineer Detachment - Grayling, MI
1439th Engineer Detachment - Grayling, MI
1442nd Engineer Detachment - Grayling, MI
745th Explosive Ordnance Disposal - Grayling, MI

Michigan Air National Guard units include:
 127th Wing, Selfridge Air National Guard Base
 110th Wing, Battle Creek Air National Guard Station/W. K. Kellogg Airport
 Alpena Combat Readiness Training Center, Alpena Air National Guard Base

The Michigan National Guard has two State Partnership Program relationships. One is with the Latvian National Armed Forces. The program began in October 2009. The other is with the Armed Forces of Liberia.

See also
Michigan Department of Military and Veterans Affairs
Michigan Naval Militia
Michigan Volunteer Defense Force

References

External links
Michigan Army National Guard Units 
Bibliography of Michigan Army National Guard History compiled by the United States Army Center of Military History

.01
National Guard (United States)
Military units and formations in Michigan